ONErpm (ONE Revolution People's Music) is a digital distribution service and fan engagement platform founded in 2010 by Emmanuel Zunz and Matthew Olim, the latter one of the co-founders of CDNow, a pioneer in digital music. The company offers such services as direct-to-fan sales, distribution to multiple web outlets including iTunes, Spotify, Amazon MP3, Rdio, Google Music, Deezer, eMusic, YouTube, music sharing widgets and an app that allows artist to stream and sell music on Facebook

According to information from the site, ONErpm charges no upfront fees and gives 85% of sales to artists and labels in a nonexclusive deal, so the rights of artists are preserved and they also have an option to distribute content using Creative Commons licenses. In 2013, OneRPM began offering a free package that includes distribution to Rdio, Grooveshark and YouTube in which artists can now receive revenue generated from advertising on the video platform.

With offices in New York City, Nashville and São Paulo, the company distributes music from artists like Metric, Tame Impala, Brett Kissel, Ozomatli, Cabas and important Brazilian artists like Erasmo Carlos, BNegão, Chitãozinho & Xororó, Emicida, Leoni. According to company information, the catalog has around 15,000 artists around the world and 60,000 fans registered on the site.

ONErpm's statistics include 8 billion video plays per month, 500 million subscribers, and two billion audio streams per month. More recently, ONErpm signed a deal with 112.

See also 
 CD Baby

References

External links

Internet properties established in 2010
Online music stores of the United States